Encyclia diurna is a species of orchid.

Synonyms 
Limodorum diurnum Jacq. (Basionym)
Cymbidium diurnum (Jacq.) Sw.
Epidendrum diurnum (Jacq.) Poir.
Cymbidium glandulosum Kunth
Epidendrum virens Lindl.
Encyclia virens Schltr.
Encyclia wageneri (Klotzsch) Schltr.
Hormidium virens Brieger
Epidendrum glandulosum (Kunth) Garay
Epidendrum remotiflorum C. Schweinf.
Epidendrum wageneri Klotzsch
Encyclia glandulosa (Kunth) P. Ortiz
Encyclia remotiflora (C. Schweinf.) Carnevali & I. Ramírez

References

External links 

diurna
diurna